Vinod Kapri, (born 15 August 1972) is a filmmaker and author. He was given a National Award for his film, the then ruling Congress Party Can't Take This Shit Anymore in 2014. He made his feature debut with Miss Tanakpur Haazir Ho (Presented by Fox Star Studios )- a socio-legal satire that received extensive critical acclaim.

His second feature film PIHU (currently streaming on Netflix) has been widely appreciated in International film festivals such as Vancouver International Film Festival, Palm Springs International Film Festival (California), Fajr International Film Festival (Tehran) and Indian Film festival (Stuttgart). Pihu was the Opening Film of 48th International Film Festival of India (IFFI),2017. It soon became the talk of town that how a 100-minute film cast only one character that too a two-year-old girl.

His recent film 1232 KMS (currently streaming on Disney Hotstar) is one of the most talked about films in 2021 which depicted the journey of seven migrant labourers during COVID-19 Lockdown. The masters of Indian Cinema, Gulzar Sahab and Vishal Bharadwaj, we’re associated with this historic documentation of the COVID-19 Crisis. Vinod also wrote a Book on the same 1232KMS journey (Published by HarperCollins), which is so far translated in Hindi, Tamil, Kannada and Telugu.

Before venturing into filmmaking, he spent 23 years of his career as a TV journalist with media organisations like Zee News, Star News and India TV, where he produced and directed various documentaries and shows including those on 13 December Parliament attack, 26/11 Mumbai attack, Life of Dalai Lama, Struggle of Sundar Lal Bahuguna and Dark secrets of Aghori Sadhus. A claim by senior journalist Abhishek Upadhyay that Vinod Kapri used tragedy to promote his film caused controversy and was hot topic of social media debate.

Early life and education
Vinod Kapri, a Kumaoni originally hails from Pithoragarh in Uttarakhand but he was born in Secunderabad in Andhra Pradesh. His father was in Army, who was posted at different places across the country. Vinod Kapri completed his early education at Kendriya Vidyalaya in Secunderabad (Andhra Pradesh (now in Telangana)), Udhampur (Jammu and Kashmir), Siliguri (West Bengal), and Bareilly (Uttar Pradesh).

Vinod was studying in class 9th, when he started writing short stories. His first story was published in 1987, when he was just 16-year-old. The story was published by Hindi daily Amar Ujala, for which he received a money order of Rs. 15 as a payment. Soon enough, all leading Hindi newspapers like Dainik Jagran, Dainik Hindustan and Dainik Aaj would publish his articles and stories on various contemporary issues. In his school days, a novel written by him was published in a newspaper as a weekly series. Vinod graduated from Bareilly College in Uttar Pradesh and, at the age of 19, he launched his own monthly magazine Indian Econo Patrika.

Journalistic career

His career as a journalist began with Hindi daily Jansandesh when he was only a 20-year-old. The paper was owned by famous politician Chaudhary Devi Lal and functioned amid political interference. Vinod quit the job within a few months. Same year, in 1992, he joined Dainik Jagran as a trainee. But after a span of about 4 months, he was hired as a reporter by Daily Amar Ujala, soon became a subeditor. In 1995, he started his stint with Zee News as a trainee reporter. Within a year, editor Rajat Sharma assigned him an important beat to cover the United Front government. By 1996, he had established himself as a political reporter. Then he was given the responsibility of Uttar Pradesh Bureau Chief.

In 1998 he started producing and anchoring the weekly show 'Ek aur Nazariya' for Zee India TV. He also made documentaries on Dalai Lama, Homosexuals, Euthanasia, Doms of Benares, Mahakumbh of Allahabad and Aghori Sadhu of Haridwar. That was the first time when Aghori Sadhus were shown on TV. 
From 1999 to 2001, he produced the breakfast show 'Morning Zee' for Zee News. Later on channel, owner Subash Chandra decided to shift the show to main GEC channel Zee TV.

In 2002, he was made an output editor of Zee News. In 2004, he moved to Star News as an Executive Producer and, over the years, rose to the post of Deputy Managing Editor. In 2007, he joined India TV as a Managing editor.

Career Highlights

Vinod conceived and executed various shows like News top 10, Hindustan Hamara, Crime Reporter, Kaun Hai, 24 Ghante 24 Reporter, Aaj Ki Pahli Khabar, Top 20 reporter, Superfast 200 and Nonstop Superfast. He also made documentaries on 13 December Parliament attack, 26/11 Mumbai terror attack and life of Anna Hazare.

In 2004, he programmed a live show on a story of a Muslim couple, Arif and Gudiya. The couple became a household name for millions of viewers. The story unfolded with Arif, an Indian soldier missing for 5 years after the Kargil war, returning home to find his wife Gudiya married to another man Taufeeq and pregnant with his child. The drama that followed was broadcast live on TV for 3 full days while the entire nation was watching.

Vinod Kapri launched an acid attack survivor, Laxmi Saa, as an anchor for a weekly TV show 'Udaan' that was centred on social issues. He also launched a 21-year-old visually challenged youth, Kamal Prajapati, as a reporter who would host a weekly segment – Aankhen Kholo India – on social awareness that drew people's attention towards civic responsibilities.

Life after News
At the end of his journalistic career, Vinod Kapri decided to take up film direction. In 2014 he won a National Award for his documentary film 'Can't Take This Shit Anymore'. The film was based on true incidents of six women who left their husbands' homes due to lack of toilets. The incidents reported in Uttar Pradesh's Kushinagar district in May 2014 caught his attention, and after a thorough reconnaissance of individual stories, he built a narrative to showcase the travesty of open defecation for Women in rural India. The film was also screened at the 12th Indian Film Festival Stuttgart in Germany.

His debut film Miss Tanakpur Haazir Ho was released on 26 June 2015.  Bollywood actor, Amitabh Bachchan and director Rajkumar Hirani took to Twitter to talk about Vinod Kapri's work in the film.

Miss Tanakpur Haazir Ho, a social-political satire inspired by true incident in Rajasthan, was received critical acclaim from some quarters. The film earned rave reviews from the likes of Raju Hirani and National Award-winning director Madhur Bhandarkar.

Vinod's sharp observations of people and dialect were well noticed; film critics discovered that his craft of satire writing has striking similarities with humour of notable writers like Sri Lal Shukla, Manohar Shyam Joshi, Kashinath Singh and K P Saxena.

The film starred actors such as Annu Kapoor, Om Puri and Sanjay Mishra. It also featured actors like Ravi Kishen, Rahul Bagga and Hrishitaa Bhatt. The story of the movie is based in Tanakpur, a village in Haryana, ruled by a power wielding ‘pradhan’ whose wife falls in love with a youth in the village. Discovering the reality, and spotting both his wife and the youth together, the village headman plots a conspiracy and falsely implicates the youth on charges of raping his buffalo. The 'pradhan' exploits all the resources in the system to extract his personal revenge – helped by corrupt cops while legal system seemed helpless. However, truth prevails in the end and the youth is acquitted of absurd charges. Miss Tanakpur Haazir Ho uncovers the duplicity of society that allows powerful men to misuse the establishments to settle their own score.

Miss Tanakpur Haazir Ho was distributed by Fox Star Studios and television network STAR TV acquired its post release satellite rights.

Vinod Kapri has now launched his second film Pihu. This film has a single protagonist Pihu, who is a two-year-old girl. This film is based on a true incident reported in a national daily in 2014, where a 4-year-old girl was left alone at home by the parents. The film is a social thriller by genre.

Filmography
Can't Take This Shit Anymore (2014)
Miss Tanakpur Haazir Ho (2015)
Pihu (2018)
1232 KMS (2021)

References

External links
 
 
 
 

Journalists from Uttarakhand
People from Pithoragarh
1972 births
Living people
Kendriya Vidyalaya alumni
Indian male journalists